Wim Kat (24 October 1904 – 23 June 1990) was a Dutch sprinter. He competed in the men's 400 metres at the 1924 Summer Olympics.

References

External links
 

1904 births
1990 deaths
Athletes (track and field) at the 1924 Summer Olympics
Dutch male sprinters
Olympic athletes of the Netherlands